Kaḏḏa Dâbali Island, often called Big Island, is a rocky island off the coast of Obock Region of Djibouti.

References

Islands of the Red Sea